Ronald Jeffrey Heller (born September 18, 1963) is a former professional football tight end in the National Football League for the San Francisco 49ers, Atlanta Falcons, and Seattle Seahawks.  He played college football at Oregon State University.

Early years
Born in Grass Valley, California, he moved with his family to Clark Fork in north Idaho when he was 12, and graduated from Clark Fork High School in 1981, in a senior class of 18. He was a three-sport standout in football (All-state), basketball (All-state), and track (won the state title in the 200-meter dash). He played in an 8-man league in football.

Heller accepted a football scholarship to Oregon State University. He played for the Beavers from 1981–85, where he played as a nose guard (freshman) and linebacker (sophomore and junior), before being switched to tight end as a senior.

In 2005, he was inducted into the Idaho Athletic Hall of Fame.

Professional career

Dallas Cowboys
Heller was not selected in the 1986 NFL Draft and was signed as an undrafted free agent by the Dallas Cowboys. He was released before the start of the season.

San Francisco 49ers
The San Francisco 49ers claimed him based on a recommendation from Paul Hackett, but a preseason neck injury placed him on the injured reserve list during the 1986 season. With the 49ers he was a special teams player and a part-time starter.

Atlanta Falcons
He signed with the Atlanta Falcons as a Plan B free agent in 1989. He started 13 games and his 33 receptions for 324 yards, ranked him sixth in the National Football Conference.

Seattle Seahawks
In 1990 after being left unprotected again, he signed as a Plan B free agent with the Seattle Seahawks. He was waived on August 26, 1991. After being out of football for a year, the Seahawks re-signed him on March 10, 1992.

Personal life
Heller left football in 1993 and spent two years at Smith Barney as a financial consultant. In 1995, he co-founded Peritus Asset Management where he was CEO and Senior Portfolio Advisor. He is currently the head of Partner Development at PlanMember in Carpinteria, CA.

References

External links
 
Idaho Athletic Hall of Fame bio
Peritus Asset Management - Ron Heller
PlanMember Securities Corporation - Ron Heller

1963 births
Living people
People from Grass Valley, California
People from Bonner County, Idaho
Players of American football from Idaho
American football tight ends
Oregon State Beavers football players
San Francisco 49ers players
Atlanta Falcons players
Seattle Seahawks players
American money managers
National Football League replacement players